Mickey Sutton may refer to:

 Mickey Sutton (cornerback) (born 1960), played in the Canadian Football League, the United States Football League, and the National Football League
 Mickey Sutton (safety) (born 1943), played in the American Football League for the Houston Oilers

See also
Michael Sutton (disambiguation)